The 1936 United States men's Olympic basketball team competed in the Games of the XI Olympiad in Berlin, representing the United States of America, and was coached by Jimmy Needles of the Amateur Athletic Union's Universal Pictures team.  Gene Johnson of Wichita University assisted Needles, while Joe Reilly served as the team's director. 1936 was the first year that basketball was an official medal sport (it had been a demonstration sport in 1904).  The U.S. won the first gold medal, defeating Canada, 19–8, in a gold medal match played outdoors on a clay and sand court in the rain. James Naismith, the game's inventor, watched many of the 1936 Olympic basketball matches, and helped award medals at the end of the basketball competition.

Roster

Roster for the 1936 Olympics.

Olympic trials
As was the custom at the time, the Olympic trials consisted of a tournament between top teams from the Amateur Athletic Union, the YMCA and the National Collegiate Athletic Association.  One notably absent team from the tournament was the 1935–36 Long Island Blackbirds, who had just completed a 25–0 season behind stars Jules Bender, Ben Kramer and Art Hillhouse.  The largely Jewish Blackbirds team boycotted the trials due to the games being held in Berlin.  LIU president Tristram Walker Metcalfe stated: "Our conviction that the United States should not participate in the Olympic Games since they are being held in Germany has not been altered by the fact that our basketball team is now recognized generally as a possible Olympic representative. Such participation would be indirect, if not direct, contribution of the raising of funds to finance such participation."

Olympic tournament 

As the U.S. team arrived, they were made aware of several FIBA rules that were quite different than what the team was accustomed to in the States.  There was no  three second rule (which had then just been introduced to U.S. play), teams were limited to rosters of seven total players, and all games were to be played outdoors on a surface which was a mixture of sand and clay and which had been that of a tennis court.  Needles successfully protested another stipulation – that players had to be 6'2" or shorter to compete. To get around the seven-player team limit, Needles split the squad into two teams – one featuring the McPherson Globe Refiners players and collegian Ralph Bishop, and one featuring the AAU Universal players – and alternated them for each match.

Their first match was won in a forfeit, as their scheduled opponent Spain, in the throes of the Spanish Civil War, never showed up.  In the second match, the Universal team routed Estonia, by a score of 52–28.  A McPherson-led win over the Philippines landed the Americans in the medal round, where they defeated Mexico, to reach the gold medal game.

The gold medal game was played after a day of rain, and the weather conditions put a damper on the Canadian national team's trademark fast break playing style.  The two teams were only able to manage a combined total of eight points in the second half of play, due to the downpour, and the U.S. won the gold medal with a 19–8 victory.

Results
  2,  0 (forfeit)
 52,  28
 56,  23
 25,  10
 19,  8

References

External links 
Team profile at USA Basketball official site

United States at the Olympic men's basketball tournament
United States
olympic